Sam Menegola (born 7 March 1992) is an Australian rules footballer playing for the Geelong Football Club in the Australian Football League (AFL). He had previously been listed by Hawthorn and Fremantle, but didn't play a senior game for either club. He is related to former Swan Districts premiership winner and Richmond player, Todd Menegola.

Early career
Originally from East Fremantle in the West Australian Football League (WAFL), Menegola was first drafted in the 2011 rookie draft by Hawthorn with their first selection and nineteenth overall. He spent one season with Hawthorn before being delisted at the end of the 2011 season. 

He was drafted again in the 2012 rookie draft by Fremantle, with their third selection and forty-fourth overall. He spent three injury interrupted seasons with Fremantle without playing an AFL match and was delisted at the end of the 2014 season.  In 2013, he only played two games in the WAFL due to a knee injury and in 2014 was transferred to Peel Thunder due to Fremantle's alignment with Peel. After being delisted by Fremantle he moved to Subiaco for the 2015 WAFL season. Despite being unable to play due to an ankle injury until Round 11, Menegola finished third in the Sandover Medal, only 4 votes behind the winner, Aidan Tropiano.  He was then one of the best players in Subiaco's 2015 WAFL Grand Final winning team.

AFL career
Menegola was on Hawthorn Football Club's rookie list in 2011 and also on Fremantle Football Club's rookie list from 2012 to 2014. 

Geelong then drafted Menegola with their second selection and sixty-sixth overall in the 2015 national draft. He made his AFL debut in the thirty-point win against  in round 18, 2016 at Simonds Stadium.

In 2017 Menegola had cemented his place in the midfield along with Patrick Dangerfield and Joel Selwood.

Menegola was selected in the 2020 All Australian 40 man squad but did not make the final team. In the same year he played for Geelong in the Grand Final.

Statistics
Updated to the end of the 2022 season.

|-
| 2016 ||  || 27
| 8 || 6 || 2 || 89 || 103 || 192 || 33 || 30 || 0.8 || 0.3 || 11.1 || 12.9 || 24.0 || 4.1 || 3.8 || 2
|-
| 2017 ||  || 27
| 22 || 17 || 20 || 255 || 272 || 527 || 109 || 129 || 0.8 || 0.9 || 11.6 || 12.4 || 24.0 || 5.0 || 5.9 || 6
|-
| 2018 ||  || 27
| 23 || 22 || 12 || 283 || 259 || 542 || 126 || 103 || 1.0 || 0.5 || 12.3 || 11.3 || 23.6 || 5.5 || 4.5 || 7
|-
| 2019 ||  || 27
| 12 || 3 || 6 || 127 || 101 || 228 || 58 || 38 || 0.3 || 0.5 || 10.6 || 8.4 || 19.0 || 4.8 || 3.2 || 0
|-
| 2020 ||  || 27
| 21 || 16 || 5 || 261 || 184 || 445 || 118 || 32 || 0.8 || 0.2 || 12.4 || 8.8 || 21.2 || 5.6 || 1.5 || 5
|-
| 2021 ||  || 27
| 23 || 12 || 12 || 324 || 209 || 533 || 125 || 52 || 0.5 || 0.5 || 14.1 || 9.1 || 23.2 || 5.4 || 2.3 || 3
|-
| 2022 ||  || 27
| 7 || 5 || 4 || 87 || 38 || 125 || 87 || 38 || 0.7 || 0.6 || 12.4 || 5.4 || 17.9 || 4.0 || 1.1 || 2
|- class=sortbottom
! colspan=3 | Career
! 116 !! 81 !! 61 !! 1426 !! 1166 !! 2592 !! 597 !! 392 !! 0.7 !! 0.5 !! 12.3 !! 10.1 !! 22.3 !! 5.1 !! 3.4 !! 25
|}

Notes

Honours and achievements
Team
 2× McClelland Trophy: 2019, 2022

References

External links

Sam Menegola's WAFL statistics

1992 births
Living people
Geelong Football Club players
Box Hill Football Club players
East Fremantle Football Club players
Peel Thunder Football Club players
Subiaco Football Club players
Australian rules footballers from Western Australia
Australian people of Italian descent